Val may refer to:

Military equipment 
 Aichi D3A, a Japanese World War II dive bomber codenamed "Val" by the Allies
 AS Val, a Soviet assault rifle

Music 
Val, album by Val Doonican
VAL (band), Belarusian pop duo

People
 Val (given name), a unisex given name
 Rafael Merry del Val (1865–1930), Spanish Catholic cardinal
 Val (sculptor) (1967–2016), French sculptor
 Val (footballer, born 1983), Lucivaldo Lázaro de Abreu, Brazilian football midfielder
 Val (footballer, born 1997), Valdemir de Oliveira Soares, Brazilian football defensive midfielder

Places
 Val (Rychnov nad Kněžnou District), a village and municipality in the Czech Republic
 Val (Tábor District), a village and municipality in the Czech Republic
 Vál, a village in Hungary
 Val, Iran, a village in Kurdistan Province, Iran
 Val, Italy, a frazione in Cortina d'Ampezzo, Veneto, Italy
 Val, Bhiwandi, a village in Maharashtra, India

Other uses
 Val (film), an American documentary about Val Kilmer, directed by Leo Scott and Ting Poo
 Valley girl or Val, an American stereotype
 Abbreviation of the amino acid valine
 A weapon used in the Indian martial art of Kalarippayattu
 Vieques Air Link, a Puerto Rican airline company

See also
 VAL (disambiguation)
 Wal (disambiguation)
 Vala (disambiguation)
 Vale (disambiguation)
 Vali (disambiguation)
 Valo (disambiguation)
 Vals (disambiguation)
 Valy (disambiguation)
 Valk (surname)
 Vall (surname)
 

Hypocorisms